Ten is the first  compilation album by the Scottish singer Susan Boyle. It was released on 31 May 2019 by Syco Music and Columbia Records. The album has 13 previously released songs with four new recordings ("A Million Dreams", "Stand by Me", "500 Miles" and "Climb Every Mountain").

Track listing

Charts

References

Susan Boyle albums
2019 compilation albums
Syco Music albums